The 2022 Appalachian State Mountaineers baseball team represented Appalachian State University during the 2022 NCAA Division I baseball season. The Mountaineers played their home games at Beaver Field at Jim and Bettie Smith Stadium and were led by sixth-year head coach Kermit Smith. They were members of the Sun Belt Conference.

Preseason

Signing Day Recruits
Source:

Sun Belt Conference Coaches Poll
The Sun Belt Conference Coaches Poll was released on February 9, 2022.  Appalachian State was picked to finish tenth with 38 votes.

Preseason All-Sun Belt Team & Honors

Miles Smith (USA, Sr, Pitcher)
Hayden Arnold (LR, Sr, Pitcher)
Tyler Tuthill (APP, Jr, Pitcher)
Brandon Talley (LA, Sr, Pitcher)
Caleb Bartolero (TROY, Jr, Catcher)
Jason Swan (GASO, Sr, 1st Base)
Luke Drumheller (APP, Jr, 2nd Base)
Eric Brown (CCU, Jr, Shortstop)
Ben Klutts (ARST, Sr, 3rd Base)
Christian Avant (GASO, Sr, Outfielder)
Josh Smith (GSU, Jr, Outfielder)
Rigsby Mosley (TROY, Sr, Outfielder)
Cameron Jones (GSU, So, Utility)
Noah Ledford (GASO, Jr, Designated Hitter)

Personnel

Schedule and results

Schedule Source:
*Rankings are based on the team's current ranking in the D1Baseball poll.

References

Appalachian State
Appalachian State Mountaineers baseball
Appalachian State Mountaineers baseball seasons